Boulsdon is a village in Gloucestershire, England.

It is the location of the International Centre for Birds of Prey.

A low mound in the village may have been the site of a motte and is known as Boulsdon Manor.

References

External links

Hamlets in Gloucestershire
Newent